Phytoecia pustulata is a species of beetle in the family Cerambycidae. It was described by Schrank in 1776, originally under the genus Cerambyx. It has a wide distribution throughout Europe and the Middle East.

Subspecies
 Phytoecia pustulata pulla Ganglbauer, 1886
 Phytoecia pustulata pilipennis Reitter, 1895
 Phytoecia pustulata adulta Ganglbauer, 1884
 Phytoecia pustulata pustulata (Schrank, 1776)

References

Phytoecia
Beetles described in 1776
Taxa named by Franz von Paula Schrank